Tarao may refer to:

Tarao language, in Burma
Tarao people, Manipur, India

See also
Tarao Naga (disambiguation)
Taroa Island, east of Maloelap Atoll in the Marshall Islands
Taraon